The 1916 Penn Quakers football team was an American football team that represented the University of Pennsylvania as an independent during the 1916 college football season. In their first season under head coach Bob Folwell, the Quakers compiled a 7–3–1 record, lost to Oregon in the 1917 Rose Bowl, and outscored opponents by a total of 120 to 57.

Schedule

References

Penn
Penn Quakers football seasons
Penn Quakers football